Sanjaynagar is a residential area located in North of Bangalore, India.

References

Neighbourhoods in Bangalore